Mount Yesenin is a mountain, 2,520 m, standing 2 miles (3.2 km) northwest of Yeliseyev Rocks in the Payer Mountains of Queen Maud Land. Mapped from air photos and surveys by Norwegian Antarctic Expedition, 1956–60; remapped by Soviet Antarctic Expedition, 1960–61, and named after Russian poet Sergei Yesenin (1895–1925).

Mountains of Queen Maud Land
Princess Astrid Coast